The 1986–87 Greek Football Cup was the 45th edition of the Greek Football Cup.

Tournament details

A total of 76 teams participated, 16 from Alpha Ethniki, 20 from Beta, and 40 from Gamma. It was held in 7 rounds, the final included. An additional round was held between First and Second, with 6 matches, in order for the continuing teams to be 32.

The big surprise of the season was Panionios. After a difficult qualification against Charavgiakos in the first round, they proceeded to eliminate giants AEK Athens, PAOK and Olympiacos. They were eventually eliminated by Panathinaikos in the quarter-finals.

The final was contested by OFI, for first time in their history, and Iraklis after 7 years, with the latter having qualificatied against Panathinaikos in semi-finals. The final match was decided on the penalty shootout after a 1–1 draw. The "hero" for the winners was their goalkeeper, Myron Sifakis, who warded off two shots. What is even more impressive is that he was the third-choice goalkeeper, behind Mitseas and Chosadas.

Grigoris Papavasiliou also became the only player to win the Cup with three different clubs, after winning it with Kastoria in 1980 and Panathinaikos in 1984.

Calendar

Knockout phase
Each tie in the knockout phase, apart from the first two rounds and the final, was played over two legs, with each team playing one leg at home. The team that scored more goals on aggregate over the two legs advanced to the next round. If the aggregate score was level, the away goals rule was applied, i.e. the team that scored more goals away from home over the two legs advanced. If away goals were also equal, then extra time was played. The away goals rule was again applied after extra time, i.e. if there were goals scored during extra time and the aggregate score was still level, the visiting team advanced by virtue of more away goals scored. If no goals were scored during extra time, the winners were decided by a penalty shoot-out. In the first two rounds and the final, which were played as a single match, if the score was level at the end of normal time, extra time was played, followed by a penalty shoot-out if the score was still level.The mechanism of the draws for each round is as follows:
There are no seedings, and teams from the same group can be drawn against each other.

First round

|}

Additional round

|}

Bracket

Round of 32

|}

Round of 16

|}

Quarter-finals

|}

Semi-finals

|}

Final

The 43rd Greek Cup Final was played at the Olympic Stadium.

References

External links
Greek Cup 1986-87 at RSSSF

Greek Football Cup seasons
Greek Cup
Cup